Jason Gideon is a fictional character in the CBS crime drama Criminal Minds, portrayed by Mandy Patinkin. Gideon is a Senior Supervisory Special Agent and the unit chief of the FBI's Behavioral Analysis Unit, and appeared from the series' pilot episode "Extreme Aggressor," which was originally broadcast on September 22, 2005, until "In Name and Blood," the second episode of the third season. He is also portrayed as a younger man by Ben Savage in flashbacks.

Mandy Patinkin abruptly left the show in 2007, just as his character abruptly quit from the BAU, due to emotional distress. In 2012, Patinkin opened up about why he left stating that the show "was very destructive to my soul and my personality. After that, I didn't think I would get to work in television again." Immediately after Gideon's departure, Aaron Hotchner (Thomas Gibson) is appointed unit chief. When Hotchner also leaves the BAU, the position is given to Emily Prentiss (Paget Brewster), then temporarily to Jennifer Jareau (A. J. Cook), until Prentiss again becomes chief and remains so for the duration of the series. In season ten, Gideon is murdered off-screen by serial killer Donnie Mallick (Arye Gross).

Background
Gideon was the protégé of Max Ryan (Geoff Pierson), who taught him everything he knew about profiling. One of Gideon's earliest cases was a bomber case, which was supervised by Max. As a prank for the new member, Max and the other investigators involved planted a list of the FBI director's whereabouts over the next 48 hours in the bomber's car for Gideon to find. When he found it, before Max could stop him, Gideon rushed up 25 flights of stairs and interrupted a meeting between the director and the U.S. Attorney General in an attempt to save him.

During his early career with the FBI, Gideon was partnered with David Rossi (Joe Mantegna); following Gideon's resignation from the BAU, Rossi replaces him as Senior Supervisory Special Agent.

While investigating the case of Adrian Bale (Tim Kelleher), a.k.a. "The Boston Shrapnel Bomber," Gideon had reportedly suffered a nervous breakdown after he sent six men into a warehouse before Bale detonated a bomb inside. All six agents and a hostage were killed, and he was blamed. He took a six-month medical leave because he was suffering from post-traumatic stress disorder. Upon his return from medical leave, he is given the Senior Agent position, as Hotchner is confirmed as Unit Chief. Not much is known about his personal life, other than that he is divorced and has a son named Stephen, from whom he is estranged.

Characterization 
Through the first two seasons, Gideon is portrayed to be very good at chess, winning against Agent Spencer Reid (Matthew Gray Gubler) many times, the only exception being Reid's birthday. Prior to the series, he was said to have had a "nervous breakdown" (or "major depressive episode") after he sent six agents into a warehouse with a bomb in it; all six agents and a hostage were killed, and he was heavily criticized about the event. He showed particular dislike for the practice of using religion as a defense or motivation for one's crimes. He blamed himself for the torture Reid suffered at the hands of serial killer Tobias Hankel (James Van Der Beek), as he had ordered technical analyst Penelope Garcia (Kirsten Vangsness) to add a virus warning to the videos Hankel posted. He also blamed himself for Agent Elle Greenaway's shooting.

The character of Jason Gideon was partially based on real-life criminal profiler John E. Douglas, one of the founders of modern behavioral science.

Relationships
He helps Reid and Derek Morgan (Shemar Moore) through their personal struggles. He is shown to have a very close relationship with Reid, having hand-picked him from the FBI Academy for his team, helping Reid through many difficulties and even leaving his good-bye letter for Reid to find.

Storylines
In the show's first episode, "Extreme Aggressor," Gideon is called back to work to help profile a killer, called "The Seattle Strangler" by the media, who abducts women and holds them prisoner before strangling them and dumping their bodies. After solving the case of the Seattle Strangler, Gideon goes on vacation and stops at an old-fashioned gas station in Dumfries, Virginia. While inside, Gideon notices that the cashier (Lukas Haas) fits his profile of the Footpath Killer, a serial killer he had been investigating prior to being called in for the Seattle Strangler case. The man notices Gideon's gun and threatens him with a shotgun, insisting that he tell him who he is. When Gideon reveals he is with the FBI, the killer becomes even more agitated and begins stuttering, a feature included in Gideon's profile. Gideon then tells the man that he can tell him the one thing no one has ever been able to tell him: why he stutters. However, Gideon does not truly know the answer but is merely trying to provoke a stutter in order to distract the killer. The killer forces Gideon down a hall and into a small room full of pictures of his victims. Gideon intentionally demeans and insults the killer, increasingly agitating him and making his stutter worse. He takes his eyes off Gideon just long enough for him to grab the gun and subdue the killer.

In "Won't Get Fooled Again," a copycat bomber uses the methods of serial bomber Adrian Bale, the same criminal who committed the warehouse bombing that killed his six colleagues. Gideon has to face his past and Bale, to find out who the bomber is and stop him. After preventing the copycat's suicide bombing, Gideon is forced to make a deal with Bale to help defuse a bomb set to kill the BAU team and a hostage. When Gideon realizes that Bale is lying about how dismantle it, he calls his bluff, saving them all from a bomb going off. He then has the pleasure of returning Bale to prison, the burden of the six agents' deaths presumably gone, even mocking him while he was being placed in a cell by using Bale's own words ("[A]n emotional release") in a sentence; he states that he finds an emotional release in putting away criminals like Bale.

In "No Way Out," Gideon faces serial killer Frank Breitkopf (Keith Carradine). The BAU had received a call from Georgia Davis (Melissa Leo), the Sheriff of the Golconda, Nevada Sheriff's Department, who had recently found two murder victims, both missing their right rib bones, similar to a case that took place in 1996. However, Gideon realized that this killer has been active for 30 years. After studying one of the murder victims, he determines that the killer has extensive medical knowledge; his victims are alive when he cuts off their limbs; and he uses Ketamine to immobilize his victims. With this information, Gideon and the team are able to build a profile of the killer. In order to find the killer, the Sheriff's Department set up a road-block looking for an RV, truck, or trailer, which was believed to be his mode of transportation.

Gideon later noticed that something is bothering Davis, and she tells him that the profile the BAU gave them reminds her of the experience of a mentally ill local named Jane Hanratty (Amy Madigan), a.k.a. "Crazy Jane". The killer had abducted Jane 30 years before on the side of a road when her car broke down, but let her live; she believed that an alien had abducted her. Gideon deduces that the killer allowed Jane to survive because she wasn't scared of him. Eventually, Gideon leads local police in cornering Breitkopf in Fat Sam's Diner, and he tells them that he has abducted a group of schoolchildren in the middle of a desert, and is willing to let them go if Gideon brings Jane to him. Gideon makes a deal with Breitkopf: he and Jane will come with him if he takes them to where the children are. After the police rescue the children, Breitkopf and Jane walk off while Gideon runs in the opposite way. Gideon and Hotchner try to follow Breitkopf's tracks, but they suddenly disappear in the desert.

In "No Way Out II: The Evilution of Frank," while Gideon is trying to make up his mind about what flowers to buy his new girlfriend, Sarah Jacobs (Moira Squier), he sees Jane. When he looks up again, she has disappeared. Gideon then receives a call from Breitkopf, who is in Gideon's apartment, having murdered Sarah. He demands to have Jane back before hanging up. When the BAU begin to investigate, Gideon contacts Hotchner from a pay phone and tells him that Breitkopf dumped something in the trash on the street, later revealed to be bloody clothing. During the investigation, it is deduced that Breitkopf is targeting people Gideon previously rescued. Breitkopf later kills one such person, Rebecca Bryant (Amanda Bernero), who was abducted by serial killer Randall Garner (Charles Haid) and held captive for two years before being rescued by the BAU. Later, Tracy Belle (Elle Fanning), the only living victim of preteen spree killer Jeffrey Charles (Cameron Monaghan), goes missing. Gideon and Garcia are later able to figure out that the only story that moved Breitkopf the first time Gideon met him was that of the body of a woman who was found in an apartment on the Upper East Side of New York City because he was talking about his mother. Gideon then realizes that Breitkopf was hiding his mother's existence. Later, the team manages to find Breitkopf, who is calmly sitting on a bench at the Union Train Station, waiting for them to bring him Jane. The team brings in Jane, who refuses to go with Breitkopf. Gideon shows up and tells Breitkopf about Sarah, Breitkopf's mother, who Gideon claims was a prostitute. As Gideon and Hotchner describe Breitkopf, Jareau and Reid locate Tracy, who is bound and gagged but unharmed. Breitkopf convinces Jane to come back to him, and the two commit suicide. Later, Tracy calls Gideon and thanks him for saving her once again.

Departure and Death
Gideon began to lose confidence in his profiling skills after Sarah's murder. During his final case in Arizona ("Doubt," season 3), he further loses faith in his abilities when his decision to release a suspect resulted in the deaths of both the suspect and a young woman. As a result of Gideon's actions, Hotchner is suspended, which is the final straw for Gideon. At the end of the following episode, "In Name and Blood," Reid visits Gideon's cabin but finds only his gun and badge, along with a letter meant for him. Gideon is last seen entering a Nevada diner; asked by a waitress where he is going, he replies that he does not know his destination or how he would know when he had reached it. He then leaves the diner and drives off, as his voiceover off-screen narrates the final lines of his letter: "I guess I'm just looking for it again. For the belief I had back in college. The belief I had when I first met Sarah and it all seemed so right. The belief in happy endings."

In the Season 10 episode "Nelson's Sparrow," Gideon is murdered off-screen, having been shot dead at a close range by serial killer Donnie Mallick, whom he and Rossi had investigated 30 years before. During the flashbacks focusing on a young version of him for the episode, which show him working at the BAU in 1978, he is played by Ben Savage.

References

Criminal Minds characters
Fictional Behavioral Analysis Unit agents
Television characters introduced in 2005
Fictional characters with post-traumatic stress disorder
American male characters in television
Fictional murdered people